Havelock Nelson (born May 6, 1964) is an American music journalist and the co-author of the 1992 book Bring the Noise: A Guide to Rap Music and Hip Hop Culture. Nelson was Billboard magazine's first rap editor where he singled out KMD's sophomore album Black Bastards contending that its artwork and title were offensive. This eventually led to Elektra records shelving the project.
Nelson has written stories and reviews for Entertainment Weekly and Rolling Stone
magazine and has been a contributor to the Huffington Post.

Nelson has contributed to Vibe's History of Hip Hop (Random House), and been quoted in The New York Times, The Washington Post, and People magazine. He has also appeared twice on TV-One's Unsung, and will host the forthcoming In-Depth with Havelock Nelson which is currently in pre-production.

References 

American music journalists
American documentary filmmakers
American writers about music
American columnists
1964 births
Living people
People from Georgetown, Guyana
City College of New York alumni
20th-century American journalists
American male journalists